Vilangudi is a village in the Kumbakonam taluk of Thanjavur district, Tamil Nadu, India.
It is nearly 10 km from Aduthurai.

Demographics 

As per the 2001 census, Vilangudi had a total population of 1210 with 611 males and 599 females.  The sex ratio was 980. The literacy rate was 68.81

References 

 

Villages in Thanjavur district